Abbotsford is a federal electoral district in British Columbia, Canada, that has been represented in the House of Commons of Canada since 2004.

Demographics

The riding has the lowest proportion of Catholics in Canada, with just 10.6% of the population adhering to Catholicism., as well as the highest proportion (9.8%) of "Christian, not included elsewhere" (non-Protestant, non-Catholic, non-Orthodox). 12.2% of its population claim Dutch ethnic origin, the highest such figure for any Canadian federal riding.

Geography
As of the 2012 federal electoral boundaries redistribution, the district includes the southeastern portion of the City of Abbotsford and the Upper Sumas 6 Indian reserve.

History
The electoral district was created in 2003. 56.1% of the riding was taken from Fraser Valley riding, and 43.9% from Langley—Abbotsford.

The 2012 federal electoral boundaries redistribution concluded that the electoral boundaries of Abbotsford should be adjusted, and a modified electoral district of the same name will be contested in future elections. The redefined Abbotsford loses portions of its current territory in the north and west to the new districts of Mission—Matsqui—Fraser Canyon and Langley—Aldergrove. These new boundaries were legally defined in the 2013 representation order, which came into effect upon the call of the 42nd Canadian federal election, scheduled for October 2015.

The 2015 Canadian general election marked the first time a Conservative candidate was elected in Abbotsford with less than 50% of the popular vote.

Members of Parliament

This riding has elected the following Members of Parliament:

Current Member of Parliament
Abbotsford's MP is Ed Fast. He is a member of the Conservative Party of Canada and was first elected in the 2006 election. He is a former Abbotsford city councillor and has worked as a lawyer, having earned a law degree at University of British Columbia. During the 40th Parliament, since January 2009, he was the chair of the Standing Committee on Justice and Human Rights and a member of the Liaison Committee.

Election results

See also
 List of Canadian federal electoral districts
 Past Canadian electoral districts

References

 Library of Parliament Riding Profile
 Expenditures - 2004

Notes

External links
 CBC candidate nomination page
 Elections Canada

British Columbia federal electoral districts
Politics of Abbotsford, British Columbia